Dean Willford Junior Mason (born 28 February 1989) is an English-born Montserratian footballer. Primarily a right back, he has also played as a midfielder. Mason is a Montserrat international and holds the record as their most capped player.

Club career
Mason started his career with a short spell with Southampton's Academy. He then joined Barnet's youth side, and was signed up with the first team squad.
After spending two years with Barnet, he signed for AFC Wimbledon where he helped them gain promotion and win the Conference South championship. He scored his debut league goal in his third appearance as a substitute on 16 August 2008 in a 3–1 home victory over Bognor Regis Town. In December 2008 he was loaned to Northwood. After promotion he was later released and joined Maidenhead United. This was short lived due to lack of playing time and he later joined Bishops Stortford.

He signed for Chesham United on 10 August 2011 making 2 appearances, before signing for Haringey Borough on 20 September 2011 making 10 appearances and scoring 2. He left Haringey Borough by mutual consent and signed for Isthmian League club Canvey Island on 23 January 2012, 
With Canvey Island he won the Essex Senior Cup, beating Dagenham & Redbridge on penalties in the semi final and Colchester United 1–0 in the final. Canvey Island won the trophy without conceding a goal throughout the competition.

In January 2013 he was on trial with Belgium side Union St. Gilloise but failed to agree terms. In June 2013 he joined Wingate & Finchley and made his debut on 10 August 2013 in a 4–0 victory over Carshalton Athletic. On 26 October 2013, Mason opened his goalscoring account for Wingate & Finchley when he struck the opening goal in a 3–0 home victory over Bognor Regis Town. Mason made his final appearance for the club in a 1–0 home defeat to Leiston on 18 January 2014.

In July 2014 he joined Arlesey Town and scored on his league debut on 9 August 2014 in a 1–0 victory over Dorchester Town. Mason left Arlesey Town in December 2014 and joined Conference North side Lowestoft Town, where he spent two seasons. In the 2016–17 season Mason briefly joined Concord Rangers before joining Cambridge City. He then signed for Ware for the rest of the season, and stayed on into the following season. Mason played in an Alan Turvey Trophy game for Enfield Town in August 2018. In February 2019 Mason started a Berks & Bucks Senior Cup game for Maidenhead against Aylesbury United. Four days later he was an unused substitute for their National League win over Leyton Orient. Mason joined Hayes & Yeading United at the start of the 2019–20 season, later moving on to Spartan South Midlands League team London Tigers.

International career
Mason was called up to the Montserrat national team in August 2012, for the 2012 Caribbean Championship First Round qualifiers, held in Martinique. Despite not qualifying past the group stages, he helped Montserrat achieve their first victory since 1995 and their first ever victory since joining FIFA, beating the British Virgin Islands 7–0.

In May 2014, he was called up by Montserrat to face U.S. Virgin Islands and Bonaire in the preliminary round of the 2014 Caribbean Cup qualification phase. He returned to the national team in September 2018 for 2019–20 CONCACAF Nations League qualifying.

Mason won his 13th cap against Dominican Republic in October 2019, which saw him become Montserrat's most-capped player in their history.

References

External links
 http://www.aylesburyunitedfc.co.uk/players/dean-mason

1989 births
Living people
Footballers from Islington (district)
English footballers
Montserratian footballers
Montserrat international footballers
Association football defenders
Association football midfielders
Southampton F.C. players
Barnet F.C. players
Welwyn Garden City F.C. players
AFC Wimbledon players
Northwood F.C. players
Maidenhead United F.C. players
Leyton F.C. players
Bishop's Stortford F.C. players
Chesham United F.C. players
A.F.C. Hayes players
Haringey Borough F.C. players
Canvey Island F.C. players
East Thurrock United F.C. players
Wingate & Finchley F.C. players
Wealdstone F.C. players
Arlesey Town F.C. players
Lowestoft Town F.C. players
Concord Rangers F.C. players
Cambridge City F.C. players
Ware F.C. players
Enfield Town F.C. players
Hayes & Yeading United F.C. players
London Tigers F.C. players
National League (English football) players
Isthmian League players
Southern Football League players
English people of Montserratian descent
Black British sportspeople